Purnia Lok Sabha constituency (formerly Purnea) is one of the 40 Lok Sabha (parliamentary) constituencies in Bihar state in eastern India.

Assembly segments
Presently, Purnia Lok Sabha constituency comprises the following six Vidhan Sabha (legislative assembly) segments:

Members of Parliament
The following is the list of the Members of Parliament elected from this constituency

General Election Result

See also
 Purnia district
 List of Constituencies of the Lok Sabha
 Kolasi
 Katihar

References

External links
Purnia lok sabha  constituency election 2019 date and schedule

Lok Sabha constituencies in Bihar
Politics of Purnia district
Politics of Katihar district